Waving Not Drowning is a solo album by Rupert Hine.  It was originally released in 1982, A&M Records, and re-released on CD in 2001, VoicePrint. "The Sniper" was dedicated to Liam Byrne and "House Arrest" was dedicated to Donald Woods. The album title alludes to the Stevie Smith poem, Not Waving but Drowning.

Track listing
Music composed by Rupert Hine; lyrics by Jeannette Obstoj

"Eleven Faces"
"The Curious Kind"
"The Set Up"
"Dark Windows"
"The Sniper"
"Innocents in Paradise"
"House Arrest"
"The Outsider"
"One Man's Poison"
"Kwok's Quease" (Bonus CD track. Originally B-side of "The Set Up" single)

Personnel
Rupert Hine - keyboards, drums, vocals
Phil Palmer - guitar
Geoffrey Richardson - guitar, viola
Phil Collins - drums
Steve Negus - drums
Trevor Morais - drums
Ollie W Tayler - saxophone
Chris Thompson - additional vocals
Stephen W Tayler - engineering, mixing, co-production

References 

1982 albums
Rupert Hine albums
Albums produced by Rupert Hine
A&M Records albums